Desiderius is a Latin given name, related to desiderium - which can be translated as "ardent desire" or "the longed-for".  Various other forms include Desiderio in Italian, Desiderio or Desi in Spanish, Desidério in Portuguese, Didier in French and Dezső in Hungarian.

Desiderius may refer to:

 Desiderius (died c. 786), the last king of the Lombard Kingdom of northern Italy
 Desiderius, Abbot of Monte Cassino (c. 1026–1087), successor of Pope Gregory VII
 Desiderius Erasmus (c. 1466–1536), Dutch humanist and theologian
 Desiderius Hampel (1895-1981), Waffen-SS general
 Desiderius of Aquitaine (died 587), Gallo-Roman dux in the Kingdom of the Franks
 Desiderius Wein (1873-1944), Hungarian doctor and gymnast

Saints 
Desiderius (lector), (died c. 303)
Desiderius of Auxerre, (died 621), bishop of Auxerre
Desiderius of Cahors (c. 580–655), Merovingian royal official
Desiderius of Fontenelle (died c. 700), Frankish saint
Desiderius of Vienne (died 607), archbishop of Vienne and chronicler
Desiderius of Pistoia, (died 725); See Barontius and Desiderius

See also
 Desiderio
 Didier (disambiguation)
 Dizier

Masculine given names